James Daniel McCallum Clyde (born May 1961) is an English actor, best known for his work in Anonymous, Croupier, Boudica and the CBBC's series Leonardo as Piero de' Medici. He also performed as Phillip Strenger in The Witcher 3: Wild hunt. On stage, he appeared in Mr Thomas by Kathy Burke in 1990.

Clyde is the son of the actor and musician Gordon Clyde; he was educated at Highgate School.

Filmography

References

External links
 

Living people
1961 births
English male film actors
English male television actors
English male video game actors
English male voice actors
People educated at Highgate School
20th-century English male actors
21st-century English male actors